Tel Baruch is a luxury neighborhood dating back to 1947, located on the northern side of the Yarkon River, in the northeast of Tel Aviv, Israel.{
  "type": "FeatureCollection",
  "features": [
    {
      "type": "Feature",
      "properties": {},
      "geometry": {
        "type": "Point",
        "coordinates": [
          34.81751918792725,
          32.12249072391715
        ]
      }
    }
  ]
}

The neighborhood 
The neighborhood is divided into two parts:
 Tel Baruch - The old section of Tel Baruch, south of KKL-JNF Boulevard, was the first neighborhood built north of the Yarkon, founded in 1946. It was named after Mordechai (Marko) Yosef Baruch (1872-1899), a Zionist activist in Algeria, Bulgaria, Egypt and Italy. The first inhabitants of the neighborhood were immigrants from Turkey and Bulgaria, and were resettled in October 1947. In the first stage, 32 housing units were built in the neighborhood, and the neighborhood continued north of KKL-JNF Boulevard in 1949–1950. The elementary school of the poet Yehuda Alharizi was inaugurated in 1951. At the beginning of the Six-Day War, Tel Baruch was hit by an artillery shell from Qalqiliya.
 Tel Baruch North - The new part of the neighborhood was established in the late 90s. More than 70% of the construction in Tel Baruch North is the construction of saturated residential buildings of 4-8 floors, and the rest are villas. It has a shopping center called Mikado Center, a Naomi Shemer elementary school and a boarding school for children from families that can not grow them normatively. During the British Mandate there was a military camp.

The two parts of the neighbourhood are considered luxurious and combine large areas of public parks and woods, and a beach.

Notable residents
Ron Huldai
Galit Gutmann
Avi Gabbay

References

External links

Neighborhoods of Tel Aviv
Upper class